1828 in sports describes the year's events in world sport.

Boxing
Events
 27 May — Jem Ward retains his English Championship with a 17-round victory over Jack Carter at Shepperton.

Cricket
Events
 Following the roundarm trial matches in 1827, MCC modifies Rule 10 of the Laws of Cricket to permit the bowler's hand to be raised as high as the elbow.  An impasse results as, in practice, Sussex bowlers William Lillywhite and Jem Broadbridge continue to bowl at shoulder height and the umpires do not no-ball them.
England
 Most runs – Jem Broadbridge 316 @ 19.75 (HS 71)
 Most wickets – Jem Broadbridge 46 (BB 5–?)

Horse racing
England
 1,000 Guineas Stakes – Zoe
 2,000 Guineas Stakes – Cadland
 The Derby – Cadland
 The Oaks – Turquoise
 St. Leger Stakes – The Colonel

Rowing
Events
 Anthony Brown, a Tyneside boat builder, develops the first crude riggers on rowing boats for racing.

References

 
Sports by year